Space Invader is the fourth solo album by former Kiss guitarist Ace Frehley, released in the UK on August 18, 2014 and in the US on August 19 via eOne Music. It is his first album of new studio material since 2009's Anomaly. Frehley self-produced the album, which was recorded at The Creation Lab in Turlock, California.

On its release, the album reached No. 9 on the Billboard 200 albums chart, the only time a solo album from a past or current Kiss member has ever attained a US top 10 album position.

Album artwork
The cover art for Space Invader was painted by fantasy artist Ken Kelly, notable for painting the cover art for the Kiss albums Destroyer in 1976 and Love Gun in 1977. Of the project, Kelly said "It was very exciting when I was approached with the idea of doing an album cover for Ace. I am very pleased with the results and proud to play a part of Ace's continuing successful career!"

Track listing

Personnel
Band members
 Ace Frehley – lead and backing vocals, guitars, bass, sound effects, producer, engineer
 Chris Wyse – bass
 Matt Starr – drums, percussion, backing vocals

Additional musicians
Alex Salzman - keyboards
Phil Allen, Chris Cassone, Rachael Gordon, Ken Gullic, Warren Huart, Ronnie Mancuso, Larry Russell – backing vocals

Production
Warren Huart – engineer, mixing
Mike Everett, Alex Salzman, Ronnie Mancuso, Mark Greene, Larry Russell – engineers
Phil Allen – assistant engineer
Adam Ayan – mastering
Paul Grosso – creative director, design
Ken Kelly – cover painting
Jayme Thornton – photography

Charts

References

2014 albums
Ace Frehley albums
MNRK Music Group albums
Albums with cover art by Ken Kelly (artist)